A Keen Soldier: The Execution of Second World War Private Harold Pringle by Andrew Clark is a historical study of the only execution of a Canadian soldier for military crimes committed during the Second World War. Harold Pringle 
was executed for murder shortly after the conclusion of the war in Europe. A Keen Soldier was published by Vintage Canada in 2002. It was a finalist for Canada's Governor General's Literary Award for non-fiction in 2003.

References 

2002 non-fiction books
Canadian non-fiction books
History books about World War II